Avigdor Dagan (Hebrew: אביגדור דגן; born Viktor Fischl; 30 June 1912 – 28 May 2006) was a Czech-Israeli writer, playwright, literary translator, and diplomat. Prior to adopting the Hebraic name in 1955, his name was Viktor Fischl, Dagan, being related to the Hebrew word dag (fish), an approximate translation of Fischl as a diminutive of "fish".

Life
After graduating from the Charles University in Prague, he entered the diplomatic service. In 1939 he emigrated to the United Kingdom to escape the Nazis, where he became an associate to Jan Masaryk. After the end of the war, he returned home, but on the 1948 coup d'état emigrated to Israel, thereafter changing his name to the one he held through the end of his life.

In Israel he continued his diplomatic career becoming plenipotentiary; he was the first Israeli ambassador in Vienna in 1956, the ambassador in Norway (and while based in Oslo, he was Ambassador to Iceland and Poland.  At the same time he continued writing in Czech.  Most of his prose was first published in Israel, some in England or in the US.  In 1990 he visited his homeland for the first time since his fleeing for refuge. After a long break, publication resumed in his home country, and his works received broader recognition.  He was awarded the honorary doctorate from the Charles University.

Although he was able to be employed as a diplomat and produce output as an author at the same time, from 1977 onward he devoted his time solely to writing.  In his lifelong literary career, he started out as a poet, then later became known as a writer of collections of short stories and novels.  He is known for his modern Czech translations of Psalms and the Song of Songs.  His works were translated from Czech into Hebrew as well as other languages; his best known novel Dvorní šašci (The Court Jesters) was translated into 12 languages.

Selected works 
 Jaro (Spring) (1933)
 Kniha nocí (1936)
 Hebrejské melodie (Hebrew tunes) (1936)
 Evropské žalmy (London, 1941)
 Mrtvá ves (London, 1943)
 Anglické sonety (1946)
 Písen o lítosti (1948)
 Kuropění (The Cock's Crow) (1975)
 The Clock of Human Form (1982)
 Dvorní šašci (The Court Jester, 1990, Japanese translation: 2001)
 Kafka of Jerusalem (1996)
 Poezie Starého zákona (Tales of an Old Silk Hat) (1998)

Non-fiction 
 Hovory s Janem Masarykem (Conversations with Jan Masaryk, 1952 in the USA)

References

External links
 Remembering Viktor Fischl, a writer and diplomat with the gift of seeing things from the other's point of view, obituary by David Vaughan. Radio Praha 30 May 2006
http://www.ynetnews.com/articles/0,7340,L-3256363,00.html

1912 births
2006 deaths
Ambassadors of Israel to Austria
Ambassadors of Israel to Norway
Ambassadors of Israel to Poland
Czech novelists
Czech male novelists
Czech poets
Czech male poets
Czechoslovak diplomats
Czechoslovak emigrants to Israel
Charles University alumni
Israeli novelists
Israeli people of Czech-Jewish descent
Jews who immigrated to the United Kingdom to escape Nazism
Naturalised citizens of the United Kingdom
Writers from Hradec Králové
Recipients of the Order of Tomáš Garrigue Masaryk
Ambassadors of Israel to Iceland